Ruili Border Economic Cooperation Zone (RLBECZ) is a Chinese State Council-approved Industrial Park based in Ruili City, Dehong Prefecture, Yunnan, China, founded in 1992 and was established to promote trade between China and Myanmar.

The cooperation zone was located between Ruili urban and Jiegao, with a planning area of 13.45 km2. But in 2013, the Ruili city government moved the cooperation zone to Nongdao town, and expand the planning area to 51.45 km2.

See also

 Sino-Burmese relations
 Kunming Economic and Technology Development Zone
 Kunming High-tech Industrial Development Zone
 Hekou Border Economic Cooperation Zone
 Wanding Border Economic Cooperation Zone

References

Economy of Yunnan
Special Economic Zones of China
Ruili